Josh Dolan (born August 14, 1991) is a Boston-based American stand-up comedian, writer, actor and radio personality. He also hosts the podcast called Breaking The Ice.

Personal life 

Dolan grew up in Ayer, Massachusetts. In 2013, he was cast in the award-winning TV show The Folklorist. Josh was a co-producer on the Boston, MA radio show, The Hill-Man Morning Show on WAAF (FM). Josh was also a contributor as a Boston Bruins Beat Reporter for WEEI.com before leaving the position to return to WAAF. Dolan was a part of the Matty and Nick Show on WAAF until the cancellation of the show in 2019. Dolan was the producer and co-host of the new afternoon drive show on WAAF with Mike Hsu until WAAF went off the air in February 2020. He has done a lot of charity work with the Boston Bruins Alumni and regularly plays in charity hockey games. During a show in June 2016, Dolan was opening for comedian Lenny Clarke, and during Dolan's comedy routine he proposed to his long time girlfriend Laura. Josh and Laura were married on St. Patricks Day of 2018. On air, Josh is known by the name @NotJoshDolan, a nickname given to him by former Bruins player and co-worker Lyndon Byers.

Josh Dolan now hosts the well known Boston podcast called Breaking The Ice Podcast  along with former WAAF personalities, Mike Hsu and Isaiah Moskowitz.

He is also a host on Dirty Water TV on NESN.

References

External links 

1991 births
Living people